Erika Eschebach (born 1954) is a German woman historian and since 1 March 2010 director of the Dresden City Museum.

Life 
Born in Göttingen, Eschebach is the daughter of the architect, urban planner and building researcher . After studying history, German studies and classical archaeology at the Georg-August-Universität Göttingen, she worked at the Städtisches Museum Braunschweig from 1992 to 2010 and from 2008 to 2010 as its provisional director. On 1 March 2010, Eschebach took over as director of the Stadtmuseum in Dresden.

Publications 
as (co-)editor:
 with : Dresdner Porzellan. Mythos–Repräsentation–Inspiration. Katalog zur Ausstellung im Stadtmuseum Dresden 2012, .
 with Andrea Rudolph: Die Schuchs. Eine Künstlerfamilie in Dresden. Sandstein Verlag, Dresden 2014, .
as co-author:
 ,  among others (ed.):  – 8. bis 18. Jahrhundert. Appelhans Verlag, Braunschweig 2006, .
 Horst-Rüdiger Jarck,  (ed.): Braunschweigisches Biographisches Lexikon – 19. und 20. Jahrhundert. Hahnsche Buchhandlung, Hanover 1996, .
 Städtisches Museum Braunschweig and Hochschule für Bildende Künste Braunschweig (ed.): Deutsche Kunst 1933–1945 in Braunschweig. Kunst im Nationalsozialismus. Katalog der Ausstellung vom 16. April – 2. Juli 2000. Verlag Olms, Hildesheim u. a. 2000,

References

External links 
 
 
 Veröffentlichungen von Erika Eschebach im Opac der 

20th-century German historians
German women historians
Directors of museums in Germany
1954 births
Living people
Writers from Göttingen
20th-century German women writers